The 1966–67 Sheffield Shield season was the 65th season of the Sheffield Shield, the domestic first-class cricket competition of Australia. Victoria won the championship.

Table

Statistics

Most Runs
Les Favell 785

Most Wickets
Tony Lock 51

References

Sheffield Shield
Sheffield Shield
Sheffield Shield seasons